Our Town is a 1940 American drama romance film adaptation of a play of the same name by Thornton Wilder starring  Martha Scott as Emily Webb, and William Holden as George Gibbs. The cast also included Fay Bainter, Beulah Bondi, Thomas Mitchell, Guy Kibbee  and Frank Craven. It was adapted by Harry Chandlee, Craven and Wilder, and directed by Sam Wood.

The film was a faithful reproduction of the play except for two significant changes: the film used scenery, whereas the play had not; the events of the third act, which in the play revolve around the death of one of the main characters, were turned into a dream from which she awakens, allowing her to resume a normal life. Producer Sol Lesser worked with Wilder in creating these changes.

Wilder wrote producer Sol Lesser that "Emily should live.... In a movie you see the people so close "to" that a different relation is established. In the theater, they are halfway abstractions in an allegory, in the movie they are very concrete.... It is disproportionately cruel that she die. Let her live...."

A radio adaptation of the film on Lux Radio Theater on May 6, 1940, used the altered film ending.

The U.S. copyright of the film was not renewed after its first term expired in 1968.

Plot
The residents of the small town of Grover’s Corners in New Hampshire live peacefully and in harmony. Dr. Gibbs, his wife Julie, and their two children George and Rebecca are the neighbors of the Webbs, who have a lovely daughter, Emily, and a younger son, Wally. George and Emily fall in love and after three years of courting they get married. Time goes by and Emily becomes very sick with the birth of her second child. While she is dying, she meets all the people who have left this world in the years before. Emily, who remains in a kind of in-between world, remembers her previous life, but in the end the young woman decides to live and she wakes up from her dream.

Cast

 William Holden as George Gibbs
 Martha Scott as Emily Webb
 Fay Bainter as Mrs. Julia Gibbs
 Dix Davis as Joe Crowell Jr.
 Beulah Bondi as Mrs. Myrtle Webb
 Thomas Mitchell as Dr. Frank F. Gibbs
 Guy Kibbee as Mr. Charles Webb
 Tim Davis as Si Crowell
 Stuart Erwin as Howie Newsome
 Frank Craven as Stage Manager
 Doro Merande as Mrs. Louella Soames
 Philip Wood as Simon Stimson
 Ruth Tobey as Rebecca Gibbs (as Ruth Toby)
 Douglas Gardiner as Wally Webb
 Arthur B. Allen as Prof. Willard (as Arthur Allen)
 Charles Trowbridge as Rev. Dr. Ferguson
 Spencer Charters as Const. Bill Warren

Score
Aaron Copland accepted the invitation to compose the musical score for the screen version of life in the small town of Grover's Corners, New Hampshire. He explained, "For the film version, they were counting on the music to translate the transcendental aspects of the story. I tried for clean and clear sounds and in general used straight-forward harmonies and rhythms that would project the serenity and sense of security of the story." Copland arranged about ten minutes from the film score for a suite. It is dedicated to Leonard Bernstein.

Awards
The film was nominated for the Academy Award for Best Picture. Scott, who reprised her stage role as Emily Webb, was nominated for the Academy Award for Best Actress. Aaron Copland was nominated for Best Score and Thomas T. Moulton was nominated for Best Sound.

References

External links

 
 
 
 
 
 

1940 films
1940 romantic drama films
American black-and-white films
American romantic drama films
American films based on plays
1940s English-language films
Films directed by Sam Wood
Films produced by Sol Lesser
Films scored by Aaron Copland
Films set in New Hampshire
Films set in 1901
Films set in 1904
Films set in 1913
Films shot in New Hampshire
United Artists films
Films about the afterlife
1940s American films